Leif is a male given name of Scandinavian origin.

Leif may also refer to:

Leif (film), 1987 Swedish comedy film
Leif (rapper) (stylized Le1f, born 1989), American rapper
 Leif (album)

See also
 
Leaf (disambiguation)
Leef (disambiguation)